Supavadee Khawpeag (born 17 July 1976) is a Thai sprinter. She competed in the women's 4 × 100 metres relay at the 2000 Summer Olympics.

References

1976 births
Living people
Athletes (track and field) at the 2000 Summer Olympics
Supavadee Khawpeag
Supavadee Khawpeag
Place of birth missing (living people)
Asian Games medalists in athletics (track and field)
Supavadee Khawpeag
Athletes (track and field) at the 1998 Asian Games
Athletes (track and field) at the 2002 Asian Games
Athletes (track and field) at the 2006 Asian Games
Medalists at the 2002 Asian Games
Southeast Asian Games medalists in athletics
Supavadee Khawpeag
Competitors at the 2001 Southeast Asian Games
Olympic female sprinters
Supavadee Khawpeag
Supavadee Khawpeag